This list contains the top 500 cities by PM2.5 annual mean concentration measurement as documented by the World Health Organization covering the period from 2008 to 2017. The 2018 version of the WHO database contains results of ambient (outdoor) air pollution monitoring from almost 2700 towns and cities in 91 countries. Air quality in the database is represented by the annual mean concentration of particulate matter (PM10 and PM2.5, i.e. particles smaller than 10 or 2.5 micrometers, respectively).

See also
Healthy city
Zero-carbon city

References

Cities
Cities
Cities
Cities
Pollution
Pollution by city
Pollution
Cities